During the 1949–50 season Football Club Internazionale competed in Serie A.

Summary 
The campaign is best remembered by the hat-trick of Amedeo Amadei in the Milan derby after Inter started losing 1-4 and won the match with the all-time highest score (6-5) on 6 November 1949.

In the summer of 1949 Masseroni transferred in the club several players such as Giovanni Giacomazzi, youngster back from Luparense,  Renato Miglioli from Atalanta and Dutchman winger Faas Wilkes. The club finished 3rd position in league behind Milan and champions Juventus.

Squad

Competitions

Serie A

League table

Matches

Statistics

Squad statistics

Player statistics

References

Bibliography

External links 

Inter Milan seasons
Internazionale Milano